Robert R. Warnecke was a noted French electrical engineer.

Warnecke was director of research at the Compagnie générale de la télégraphie sans fil (CSF) in Paris. He received the 1954 IEEE Morris N. Liebmann Memorial Award "for his many valuable contributions and scientific advancements in the field of electron tubes, and in particular, the magnetron class of traveling wave tubes."

Selected publications 
 Warnecke, R.R., Kleen, W., Lerbs, A., Dohler, O., Huber, H., "The Magnetron-Type Traveling-Wave Amplifier Tube", Proceedings of the IRE, Volume: 38,  Issue: 5, May 1950, pages 486-495.
 R. Warnecke and P. Guénard, Les tubes électroniques à commande par modulation de vitesse, Paris, Gauthier-Villars, 1951.
 US Patent 2591322: Generator of Ultra-Short Electromagnetic Waves
 US Patent 2761088: Traveling Wave Amplifying Tube
 US Patent 2995675: Traveling Wave Tube

References 
 Report on Visits to European Electron Tube Laboratories, 1953, by W. G. Dow
 IEEE Transactions on Plasma Science, vol. 32, no. 3, June 2004, page 838.

French electrical engineers
Year of death missing